Art Weiner (August 16, 1926 – December 25, 2013) played American football as an All American end at the University of North Carolina at Chapel Hill from 1946–1949 before playing in the National Football League for the New York Yanks.

Born and raised in Newark, New Jersey, Weiner attended West Side High School.

Weiner matched the (at the time) NCAA record when he amassed 52 receptions in 1949. He averaged 16 yard/reception for career. He played alongside Charlie "Choo-Choo" Justice in what became known as the Justice-Weiner era while leading UNC to three major bowls. He was inducted into the NC sports Hall of Fame in 1973 and later the College Football Hall of Fame (1992).  He played two years of professional football after college. After his football career ended, he worked as an executive at Burlington Industries and later owned a travel business.

Weiner spent most of his adult life in Greensboro, North Carolina, USA with his wife, Marion "Boots" Weiner. They had 3 children, 8 grandchildren and 1 great-granddaughter.  Weiner died on December 25, 2013, with his family by his side.

See also
 List of NCAA major college football yearly receiving leaders

References

New York Yanks players
North Carolina Tar Heels football players
College Football Hall of Fame inductees
Players of American football from Newark, New Jersey
West Side High School (New Jersey) alumni
1926 births
2013 deaths